The Tattooed Widow (Swedish: Den tatuerade änkan) is a Swedish International Emmy Award winning TV movie from 1998, written and directed by Lars Molin.

The film is centered on the 60 plus woman Ester, played by Mona Malm. Ester is living in a somewhat failed marriage where she is expected to take care of the household and be a good grandmother. But when a female relative, aunt Agnes, dies, everything changes. Agnes' death gives Ester new possibilities and becomes an impulse for her to live her dreams.

In 1999 The Tattooed Widow was awarded an Emmy Award for best international TV movie.

Cast 
Mona Malm – Ester Hershagen
Sven Wollter – Erik Sandström
Ingvar Hirdwall – Egon Andersson
Jan Malmsjö – Leon Mark
Gösta Bredefeldt – Allan Hershagen
Pia Johansson – Anette Hershagen
Per Graffman – Jörgen Ramberg
Maria Kulle – Lillemor Hershagen
Göran Forsmark – Joakim Hershagen
Erland Josephson – Per Gunnarsson
Niklas Falk – Cederberg

External links 

1998 television films
1998 films
Swedish drama films
Swedish television films
1990s Swedish-language films
International Emmy Award for Drama winners
1990s Swedish films